is a private university in Inage-ku, Chiba, Japan. The school has an adjacent junior college.

This university is known for its small size and close ties to the Chiba Prefecture region.

Overview
The university has only a Faculty of Economics, the Department of Economics and the Department of Business Administration are located under the Faculty of Economics. And the junior college contains the Department of Business Life and the Department of Elementary Education.

Chronology
1968: Chiba Keizai College was founded.
1988: Chiba Keizai University was founded.

External links
Chiba Keizai University (in Japanese)
Chiba Keizai College (in Japanese)

Private universities and colleges in Japan
Universities and colleges in Chiba Prefecture
Buildings and structures in Chiba (city)
Educational institutions established in 1968